The 1960 United States Senate election in Kentucky took place on November 6, 1960. Incumbent Republican Senator John Sherman Cooper, who won a 1956 special election to fill the vacant seat of Alben Barkley, was elected to a full term in office, defeating Democratic former Governor and Undersecretary of Labor Keen Johnson.

Republican primary

Candidates
John Sherman Cooper, incumbent Senator since 1957
Thurman Jerome Hamlin, perennial candidate from London

Results

Democratic primary

Candidates
John Y. Brown Sr., former U.S. Representative at-large and nominee for Senate in 1946
Jesse N.R. Cecil
Wilton Benge Cupp
James L. Delk
Keen Johnson, former Governor of Kentucky (1939–43) and U.S. Undersecretary of Labor (1946–47)

Results

General election

Results

Results by county

See also
1960 United States Senate elections

Notes

References 

1960
Kentucky
United States Senate